The Chamizal dispute was a border conflict over around  on the Mexico–United States border between El Paso, Texas, and Ciudad Juárez, Chihuahua. It was caused by a shift in the Rio Grande, as a survey presented in 1852 marked differences between the bed of the Rio Grande (in ) and the present channel of the river. Tensions over the territory during the historic Taft–Diaz summit almost resulted in the attempted assassination of both presidents on October 16, 1909.

The Spanish word chamizal comes from chamizo, the common name for the four-wing saltbush (Atriplex canescens) which covered the disputed land near the present-day park.

Origins (1848–1899)
The Treaty of Guadalupe Hidalgo (which officially ended the Mexican–American War) defined the international border as the line along the middle of the deepest channel in the Rio Grande, continuously in tandem with any fluctuation in its channels or its banks. In 1884, another treaty modified this by explicitly accepting the internationally established doctrine that the line of a river-defined border shall follow the changing path of the boundary river only in response to gradual  alluvial deposition, but that sudden avulsion shall not affect the borderline.

The river continually shifted south between 1852 and 1868, with the most radical shift in the river occurring after a flood in 1864. The newly exposed land came to be known as El Chamizal, and eventually the land was settled and incorporated as part of El Paso. Both Mexico and the United States claimed the land. In 1895, Mexican citizens filed suit in the Juárez Primary Court of Claims to reclaim the land.

In 1899, both countries dug a channel across the heel of the horseshoe bend of the river at the dispute site for flood control purposes. This moved a  tract of land to the U.S. side of the river, but as man-made alterations do not change the boundary, this tract of land remained Mexican territory. This tract of land came to be known as Cordova Island, in a sense it was an island belonging to Mexico inside U.S. territory. Thus, there was little or no control by the local authorities, which created a haven for crime and opportunities for illegal crossings.

Disputes and controversy (1899–1963)

In 1909, Porfirio Díaz and William Howard Taft planned a summit in Ciudad Juárez and El Paso, a historic first meeting between a Mexican and a U.S. president and also the first time an American president would cross the border into Mexico. But tensions rose on both sides of the border over the Chamizal, which any route from El Paso to Ciudad Juárez would cross, even though it would be considered neutral territory with no flags present during the summit. The Texas Rangers, 4,000 U.S. and Mexican troops, U.S. Secret Service agents, federal agents and U.S. marshals were all called in to provide security. Frederick Russell Burnham, the celebrated scout, was put in charge of a 250-person private security detail hired by John Hays Hammond, who in addition to owning large investments in Mexico was a close friend of Taft from Yale and a U.S. Vice-Presidential candidate in 1908. On October 16, the day of the summit, Burnham and Private C.R. Moore, a Texas Ranger, discovered a man holding a concealed palm pistol standing at the El Paso Chamber of Commerce building along the procession route. Burnham and Moore captured, disarmed, and arrested the assassin within only a few feet of Díaz and Taft.

In 1910 Mexico and the United States agreed to have the dispute settled by the International Boundary and Water Commission, a body that had been created in 1889 to maintain the boundary (and which was subsequently expanded pursuant to subsequent treaties, in order to allocate river waters between the two nations, and provide for flood control and water sanitation). A tribunal was established comprising a representative from each country and a Canadian jurist, as presiding officer to investigate and deliberate over whether the change in the river's course had been gradual, whether the boundaries set by treaties were fixed, and whether the 1848 treaty applied. Mexico claimed that the boundary had never changed and therefore that the Chamizal was technically Mexican territory, while the United States claimed that the 1848 convention applied, that the boundary was the result of sudden erosion, and that the property therefore belonged to the United States.

The tribunal recommended that year that part of the disputed tract lying between the riverbed, as surveyed in 1852, and the middle of the river in 1864 would become United States territory and the remainder of the tract become part of Mexico. The United States rejected the proposal on grounds that it did not conform to the agreements of the arbitration – instead it fuelled an ongoing dispute between the two governments and fostered ill-will.

Between 1911 and 1963 various presidents made several more attempts to resolve the issue. Amongst the suggested compromises were forgiving debt, exchange of other territory along the Rio Grande, direct purchase of the tract, and inclusion of the Chamizal in the Rio Grande Rectification Project. The dispute continued to affect Mexico–United States relations adversely until President John F. Kennedy agreed to settle it on the basis of the 1911 arbitration award. It was hoped that settlement of the dispute would strengthen the Alliance for Progress and solidify the Organization of American States.

Resolution

The dispute was formally settled on January 14, 1964, when the United States and Mexico ratified a treaty that generally followed the 1911 arbitration recommendations. Although no payments were made between the two governments, the United States received compensation from a private Mexican bank for 382 structures included in the transfer. The United States also received  of Cordova Island from Mexico, and the two nations agreed to share equally in the cost of rechanneling the river. In 1964, Presidents Adolfo López Mateos and Lyndon B. Johnson met at the border to end the dispute. On September 17, 1963, the U.S. Congress introduced the American–Mexican Chamizal Convention Act of 1964, which finally settled the matter. In October 1967, President Johnson met with President Gustavo Díaz Ordaz on the border and formally proclaimed the settlement.

One of the aims of the Chamizal Convention was to build a man-made channel to prevent the Rio Grande from blurring the international boundary ever again. The two governments shared the cost of the channel, along with the cost of three new bridges. The United States established a museum known as the Chamizal National Memorial in 1974 to increase visitor awareness of cooperation, diplomacy and cultural values as a basic means to conflict resolution.

See also
 Chamizal National Memorial
 Historic regions of the United States
 Rio Grande border disputes

References

Sources

External links

 Reports of International Arbitral Awards – The Chamizal Case
 Handbook of Texas Online: Chamizal Dispute

History of the foreign relations of the United States
1963 in Mexico
International territorial disputes of the United States
Mexico–United States border
Territorial disputes of Mexico
Arbitration cases
1963 endings
El Paso, Texas 
Ciudad Juárez
Rio Grande